David Corkill is a former international lawn and indoor bowler and current sports commentator born on 15 February 1960.

Bowls career
David, from Belfast in Northern Ireland, started bowling at an early age in Tullycarnet Park where he played for Gilnahirk. He joined the Knock outdoor club and won the Irish National Bowls Championships Fours title in 1977 and the singles title in 1980 and 1988. He also won the singles at the British Isles Bowls Championships in 1981.

He represented Northern Ireland at the 1982 Commonwealth Games and 1990 Commonwealth Games and the combined Irish team at the World Bowls Championships. He earned 108 caps for Ireland playing indoors.

He is the Chairperson of the Professional Bowls Association and was a Director for World Bowls from 2002-2006.

Commentating
He is the voice for the BBC during the televised stages of the World Indoor Bowls Championships and in recent years YouTube. David was the lead BBC Lawn Bowls commentator at the 2022 Commonwealth Games.

References

Irish male lawn bowls players
Male lawn bowls players from Northern Ireland
1960 births
Living people
British sports broadcasters
Sports commentators
Bowls players at the 1982 Commonwealth Games
Bowls players at the 1990 Commonwealth Games
Commonwealth Games competitors for Northern Ireland